"Gemini" is a song by the Filipino rock band Sponge Cola.  It is the twelfth track from their debut album, Palabas. It reached and became #1 in Filipino music charts.  It is also the theme song of the Filipino version (Metropolitan Theater Guild) of William Shakespeare's Romeo & Juliet, as seen in its music video.  The song was nominated for Song of the Year in the 2006 MYX Music Awards.

The song begins with metronome by drummer Chris Cantada, then goes to the verse.  During the verse, its signature mellow guitar riff is played by lead guitarist Erwin Armovit.  This continues until the end of the first chorus.  Then, in the second verse, both guitars become heavily distorted, however, in the second chorus, it settles back to its original slow and mellow style.  The instrumental segment of the song is then played, until it finally fades out.

Music video
The music video was directed by Marie Jamora and produced by Steven Uy. It shows Romeo, played by Yan Yuzon (brother of Sponge Cola frontman and lead singer Yael Yuzon); Juliet, played by Ina Feleo (daughter of actor Johnny Delgado and director Laurice Guillen), and the narrator played by Ricky Abad. The music video was entirely shot in the Henry Lee Irwin Theatre, Ateneo de Manila University.

Like the original Romeo & Juliet, it shows the story between Juliet and his Romeo, and features its original quotes and catchphrases. The band is playing in a theater, but not in the same place where Yan Yuzon and Ina Feleo are performing.

The video was soon nominated for Favorite Music Video in the 2006 MYX Music Awards, but it lost to Rivermaya's "You'll Be Safe Here".

Versions
The song has two versions: version one is the version used in the music video, and version two being the album version.  Some differences are the intro and outro - version one begins with a melodic piano piece, followed by the song, then an outro riff that is different from the album version.

References

2004 singles
Sponge Cola songs
2004 songs
English-language Filipino songs